Silverdale is a suburb in south-eastern Hamilton in New Zealand. It is east from Hillcrest and home to Hillcrest High School, despite the school's name. Part of Silverdale is covered by the University of Waikato.

History
It was named Silverdale after the original farm on the land, which itself was named after the shining silver poplar leaves.

Features of Silverdale
The suburb forms a large part of the University of Waikato's commercial, residential and educational hinterland. Jansen Park, located between Morrinsville Rd and Masters Ave, is the biggest park in the area and is used by Hillcrest United and Waikato Unicol Football soccer during the winter season. The main suburban shopping centre is located on Silverdale Rd.

Demographics

Silverdale had a population of 2,088 at the 2018 New Zealand census, an increase of 144 people (7.4%) since the 2013 census, and an increase of 159 people (8.2%) since the 2006 census. There were 744 households, comprising 987 males and 1,101 females, giving a sex ratio of 0.9 males per female. The median age was 28.2 years (compared with 37.4 years nationally), with 405 people (19.4%) aged under 15 years, 684 (32.8%) aged 15 to 29, 765 (36.6%) aged 30 to 64, and 237 (11.4%) aged 65 or older.

Ethnicities were 60.5% European/Pākehā, 21.6% Māori, 6.3% Pacific peoples, 23.0% Asian, and 3.3% other ethnicities. People may identify with more than one ethnicity.

The percentage of people born overseas was 33.3, compared with 27.1% nationally.

Although some people chose not to answer the census's question about religious affiliation, 51.3% had no religion, 33.3% were Christian, 1.0% had Māori religious beliefs, 2.2% were Hindu, 1.6% were Muslim, 2.7% were Buddhist and 2.0% had other religions.

Of those at least 15 years old, 450 (26.7%) people had a bachelor's or higher degree, and 222 (13.2%) people had no formal qualifications. The median income was $22,300, compared with $31,800 nationally. 144 people (8.6%) earned over $70,000 compared to 17.2% nationally. The employment status of those at least 15 was that 681 (40.5%) people were employed full-time, 240 (14.3%) were part-time, and 99 (5.9%) were unemployed.

The 2013 Index of Socioeconomic Deprivation, ranked 1-10 from lowest to most deprived areas, lists Silverdale at 8/10 (high deprivation).

Education
The school opened in 1972.

It opened in 1964.

Both schools are coeducational. Rolls are as of

See also
List of streets in Hamilton
Suburbs of Hamilton, New Zealand

References

Suburbs of Hamilton, New Zealand